There are two rivers named Corumbataí River Brazil:

 Corumbataí River (Paraná)
 Corumbataí River (São Paulo)

See also
 Corumbataí (disambiguation)